Peter Maurin (May 9, 1877 – May 15, 1949) was a French Catholic social activist, theologian, and De La Salle Brother who founded the Catholic Worker Movement in 1933 with Dorothy Day.

Maurin expressed his philosophy through short pieces of verse that became known as Easy Essays. Influenced by the contemporary work of G. K. Chesterton and Vincent McNabb, he was one of the foremost promoters of the back-to-the-land movement and of Catholic distributism in the United States. He was also influenced by Peter Kropotkin, an anarchist.

Biography 
He was born Pierre Joseph Orestide Maurin into a poor farming family in the village of Oultet in the Languedoc region of southern France, where he was one of 24 children. After spending time in the De La Salle Brothers, Maurin served in the Sillon movement of Marc Sangnier until he became discouraged by the Sillonist shift from personalist action towards political action. He briefly moved to Saskatchewan to try his hand at homesteading, but was discouraged both by the death of his partner in a hunting accident and by the harsh conditions and rugged individualism that characterized his years of residence in the region.  He then traveled throughout the American east for a few years, and eventually settled in New York.

For a ten-year period, Maurin was not a practicing Catholic "because I was not living as a Catholic should."

In the mid-1920s, Maurin was working as a French tutor in the New York suburbs. It was at this time Maurin experienced a religious conversion, inspired by the life of Francis of Assisi. He ceased charging for his lessons and asked only that students give any sum they thought appropriate. This was likely prompted by reading about St. Francis, who viewed labor as a gift to the greater community, not a mode of self-promotion.  During this portion of his life, he began composing the poetry that would later be called his Easy Essays.

Dorothy Day and The Catholic Worker 

"Peter Maurin first met Dorothy Day in December 1932."  She had just returned from Washington, D.C., where she had covered the Hunger March for Commonweal and America magazines.  At the Basilica of the National Shrine of the Immaculate Conception on December 8, 1932, the feast of the Immaculate Conception, Day had prayed for inspiration for her future work. She came back to her New York apartment to find Maurin awaiting her in the kitchen.  "He had read some of her articles and had been told by George Schuster, editor of Commonweal, to look her up and exchange ideas with her." The French models and literature Maurin brought to Day's attention are of particular interest.

For four months after their first meeting, Maurin "indoctrinated" her, sharing ideas, synopses of books and articles, and analyzing all facets of daily life through the lens of his intellectual system.  He suggested she start a newspaper, since she was a trained journalist, to "bring the best of Catholic thought to the man in the street in the language of the man in the street". Maurin initially proposed the name Catholic Radical for the paper that was distributed as the Catholic Worker beginning May 1, 1933, during the depths of the Great Depression.

His ideas served as the inspiration for the creation of "houses of hospitality" for the poor, for the agrarian endeavors of the Catholic Worker farms, and the regular "roundtable discussions for the clarification of thought" that began taking place shortly after the publication of the first issue of The Catholic Worker which is considered a Christian Anarchist publication.

Maurin at times saw the paper as not quite radical enough, as it had an emphasis on political and union activity.  Shortly after the paper's first print run in early May, 1933, he left New York for the boys' camp at Mt. Tremper, where he worked in exchange for living quarters.  "[T]he paper, declaring its solidarity with labor and its intention of fighting social injustice, was not, by Maurin's standards, a personalist newspaper."  Maurin believed the Catholic Worker should stress life in small agricultural communities. As he liked to say, “there is no unemployment on the land.”

Maurin lived in Easton, Pennsylvania, where he worked on the first Catholic Worker-owned farming commune, Maryfarm. He also took part in the Catholic Worker picketing of the Mexican and German consulates during the 1930s.

Maurin traveled extensively, lecturing at parishes, colleges, and meetings across the country, often in coordination with the speaking tours of Dorothy Day.  He addressed venues as varied as Harvard students and small parishes, the Knights of Columbus and gatherings of bishops and priests.

Later years 

In 1944, Maurin began to lose his memory.  His condition deteriorated until he died at the Catholic Worker's Maryfarm near Newburgh, New York, on May 15, 1949, "the Feast of St. Dymphna, patroness of mental health, the anniversary also of St. John Baptiste de la Salle and of the Papal encyclicals Rerum novarum and Quadragesimo anno. ...Many remarked the strange convergence of anniversaries."  At the wake, many people were seen to touch their rosaries to his hands surreptitiously, indicating their belief in his sanctity.  The Staten Island Catholic Worker farm was named after Maurin following his death; the Peter Maurin Farm currently operates in Marlboro, New York.

Intellectual system 

Maurin's vision to transform the social order consisted of three main ideas:
Establishing urban houses of hospitality to care for the destitute.
Establishing rural farming communities to teach city dwellers agrarianism and encourage a movement back-to-the-land.
Setting up roundtable discussions in community centres in order to clarify thought and initiate action.

Maurin saw similarities between his approach and what he viewed was that of the Irish monks who evangelized medieval Europe.

Intellectual inspirations 
According to Dorothy Day, some of the books he had her read were the works of "Fr. Vincent McNabb and Eric Gill, Jacques Maritain, Leon Bloy, Charles Peguy of France, Don Sturzo of Italy, (Romano) Guardini of Germany, and (Nicholas) Berdyaev of Russia."  Another writer upon whom Maurin drew was Emmanuel Mounier.  Other titles included Catholicism and the Appeal to Reason by Leo Paul Ward, Humanity's Destiny by Denifle, Christian Life and Worship by Gerald Ellard, The Spirit of Catholicism by Karl Adam, and The Servile State by Hilaire Belloc.

The following books were recommended by Peter Maurin in reading lists appended to his essays.
Art in a Changing Civilization, Eric Gill
Brotherhood Economics, Toyohiko Kagawa
Charles V, D. B. Wyndham Lewis
Catholicism, Protestantism and Capitalism, Amintore Fanfani
The Church and the Land, Father Vincent McNabb, O.P.
Discourse on Usury, Thomas Wilson
Enquiries Into Religion and Culture, Christopher Dawson
Fields, Factories and Workshops, Peter Kropotkin
Fire on the Earth, Paul Hanly Furfey
The Flight from the City, Ralph Borsodi
The Franciscan Message to the World, Father Agostino Gemelli, F.M.
Freedom in the Modern World, Jacques Maritain
The Future of Bolshevism, Waldemar Gurian
A Guildsman's Interpretation of History, Arthur Penty
The Great Commandment of the Gospel, His Excellency A. G. Cicognani, Apostolic Delegate to the U. S.
Ireland and the Foundation of Europe, Benedict Fitzpatrick
I Take My Stand, by Twelve Southern Agrarians
The Land of the Free, Herbert Agar
Lord of the World, Robert Hugh Benson
The Making of Europe, Christopher Dawson
Man the Unknown, Dr. Alexis Carrel
Nations Can Stay at Home, B. O. Wilcox
Nazareth or Social Chaos, Father Vincent McNabb, O.P.
Our Enemy, the State, Albert Jay Nock
Outline of Sanity, G. K. Chesterton
A Philosophy of Work, Étienne Borne
Post-Industrialism, Arthur Penty
Progress and Religion, Christopher Dawson
Religion and the Modern State, Christopher Dawson
Religion and the Rise of Capitalism, R. H. Tawney
La Revolution Personnaliste et Communautaire, Emmanuel Mounier
Saint Francis of Assisi, G. K. Chesterton
Social Principles of the Gospel, Alphonse Lugan
Soviet Man Now, Helen Iswolsky
Temporal Regime and Liberty, Jacques Maritain
The Theory of the Leisure Class, Thorstein Veblen
Thomistic Doctrine of the Common Good, The, Seraphine Michel
Things That Are Not Caesar's, Jacques Maritain
Toward a Christian Sociology, Arthur Penty
True Humanism, Jacques Maritain
The Two Nations, Christopher Hollis
The Unfinished Universe, T. S. Gregory
The Valerian Persecution, Father Patrick Healy
What Man Has Made of Man, Mortimer Adler
Work and Leisure, Eric Gill

Legacy 
His contributions to the Catholic Worker Movement, while apparently often eclipsed in the collective memory of the movement by those of Dorothy Day, remain foundational, as evidenced by Day's insistence in The Long Loneliness and elsewhere that she would never have begun the Catholic Worker without him.  "Peter was a revelation to me," she said.  "I do know this--that when people come into contact with Peter ... they change, they awaken, they begin to see, things become as new, they look at life in the light of the Gospels.  They admit the truth he possesses and lives by, and though they themselves fail to go the whole way, their faces are turned at least towards the light."

Maurin was played by Martin Sheen in Entertaining Angels: The Dorothy Day Story.

In 2010 Mark and Louise Zwick suggested considering Peter Maurin for sainthood.

See also

 Catholic social teaching
 Christian anarchism
 Christian pacifism
 Distributism
 Localism (politics)
 Social justice

References

Further reading 
 Atkins, Robert. "Dorothy Day's Social Catholicism: The Formative French Influences". International Journal for the Study of the Christian Church, vol. 13, no. 2 (2013):96-110.
 Ellis, Marc H. Peter Maurin: Prophet in the Twentieth Century. New York: Paulist Press, 1981
 Day, Dorothy. "Maurin, Aristide Peter" in New Catholic Encyclopedia. 2nd ed. 2003.
 Day, Dorothy and Francis J. Sicius, (eds.) Peter Maurin: Apostle to the World. Marynoll: Orbis Books, 2004.
 Maurin, Peter. Catholic Radicalism: Phrased Essays For The Green Revolution. New York: Catholic Worker Books, 1949.
 Maurin, Peter. Easy Essays. Chicago: Franciscan Herald Press, 1977.
 Maurin, Peter. The Green Revolution: Easy Essays on Catholic Radicalism. Fresno, Calif.: Academy Guild Press. 1961.

External links

 Peter Maurin biography and photos at Catholic Worker
 Easy Essays by Peter Maurin
 Peter Maurin Papers at Marquette University

1877 births
1949 deaths
20th-century Roman Catholics
Catholic socialists
Catholic Workers
Christian communists
French Christian pacifists
French Christian socialists
French Roman Catholics
Nonviolence advocates
Roman Catholic activists
Roman Catholic writers
Catholicism and far-left politics
Distributism